"I Adore You" is a song by English alternative rock band Queenadreena, released as their third single from their debut album Taxidermy (1999).

Music video
A music video for the song was directed by Martina Hoogland Ivanow.

Release
"I Adore You" was released as a CD single as well as on 10" vinyl. The CD single also features a music video for "I Adore You".

Track listing

Personnel
Musicians
KatieJane Garsidevocals
Crispin Grayguitar, glockenspiel
Orson Wajihbass
Billy Freedomdrums

Technical
Ken Thomasproduction, engineering

References

2000 singles
2000 songs
Queenadreena songs